Gankhuyagiin Oyuungerel (* 1985) is a beauty queen who represented Mongolia in Miss World 2007 in China. She studied at the Humanitarian University of Mongolia, aspiring to be a financier.

See also
 Anun Chinbat
 Miss Mongolia

References

Miss World 2007 delegates
People from Ulaanbaatar
1985 births
Living people
Mongolian beauty pageant winners
Mongolian female models
21st-century Mongolian women